WHS may refer to:

Organizations
 WHSmith, a British retailer
 Walgreens Health Services, the healthcare division of Walgreens
 Washington Headquarters Services, a U.S. DoD Field Activity, located at The Pentagon
 Wau Holland Foundation (German: Wau Holland Stiftung), a German charity
 Waverly Hills Sanatorium
 William Hunt and Sons, tool manufacturers from 1780/1793 on, since 1960 a brand of Spear & Jackson
 Wisconsin Historical Society

Schools
Wales High School
Washington High School (disambiguation)
Washingtonville High School
Watertown High School (disambiguation)
Weddington High School
West High School (disambiguation)
Western High School (disambiguation)
Westlake High School (disambiguation)
Westmount High School
Wildwood High School
Williston High School (disambiguation)
Whitko High School
Walt Whitman High School (disambiguation)
Windermere High School
Woodbridge High School (disambiguation)
Woodland High School (disambiguation)
Thomas Sprigg Wootton High School

Medicine
Wobbly hedgehog syndrome
Wolf–Hirschhorn syndrome

Transport
Whyteleafe South railway station, Surrey, National Rail station code

Other uses
Wood hybrid systems
Windows Home Server
World Handicap System, a global handicapping system in the sport of golf
World Heritage Site

See also

 WH (disambiguation)